Laura Gore (30 September 1918 – 27 March 1957) was an Italian actress and voice actress. She appeared in 39 films between 1945 and 1955. She was born in Bussoleno, Turin as Laura Emilia Regli.

While studying accounting, in 1940 she won the eighth edition of the amateur song contest "L'ora del dilettante" organized by EIAR at the Teatro Carlo Felice in Genoa. After that win, Gore immediately started a successful career first as a music hall artist, later as an actress of cinema, radio and theatre. For two consecutive seasons (1949–50 and 1950–51) she was a member of the stage company of Eduardo De Filippo. She was also active as a dubber in the dubbing company ORI.

Gore died of a heart attack at 38 years old. She was married to army officer Agostino Golzi.

Partial filmography

 Romulus and the Sabines (1945) - Paolina
 His Young Wife (1945) - Brigida
 The Voice of Love (1946) - La cameriera della contessa
 Departure at Seven (1946) - Lucy D'Orsay
 The Ways of Sin (1946) - Carla Pinna
 Peddlin' in Society (1946) - Anna, la cameriera
 The White Primrose (1947) - Amica del Capo Banda
 Il vento m'ha cantato una canzone (1947)
 The Captain's Daughter (1947) - Palaska
 L'apocalisse (1947)
 Fabiola (1949)
 The Firemen of Viggiù (1949) - Pomponia
 The Emperor of Capri (1949) - Lucia
 The Merry Widower (1950) - La dottoressa
The Elusive Twelve (1950) - Carletta
 Side Street Story (1950) - La moglie del ragionier Spasiani
 Toto the Sheik (1950) - Lulù
 Tomorrow Is Another Day (1951) - Linda
 Song of Spring (1951) - Maria
 Tragic Serenade (1951) - Zia di Margherita
 Stasera sciopero (1951) - Anna
 Free Escape (1951) - Rosetta
 Viva il cinema! (1952)
 Torment of the Past (1952) - La cameriera di Florette
 The Woman Who Invented Love (1952)
 La presidentessa (1952) - Sofia, la cameriera
 Ragazze da marito (1952) - Signora Rosa
 Lulu (1953) - The Venetian maid
 Neapolitans in Milan (1953) - Rosetta
 One of Those (1953) - Silvia
 Verdi, the King of Melody (1953) - Berberina Streppono
 Matrimonial Agency (1953) - Anna
 100 Years of Love (1954) - The Snob Girl (segment "Amore 1954")
 Cose da pazzi (1954) - The Fashion Designer - Patient
 Schiava del peccato (1954) - The Maid at 'Pensione Iris'
 The Three Thieves (1954) - Doris' Friend
 Farewell, My Beautiful Lady (1954) - Clara
 I pappagalli (1955)
 Desperate Farewell (1955) - Luisa Borghi's Friend at the Hairdresser's

References

External links

1918 births
1957 deaths
People from the Province of Turin
Italian film actresses
20th-century Italian actresses